This is a list of ecological reserves in the Canadian province of Manitoba. Ecological reserves are designated by the Government of Manitoba under The Ecological Reserves Act.  For a list of all protected areas in Manitoba, see the List of protected areas of Manitoba.

References

Manitoba
Ecological reserves